Richard de Sancta Agatha was an English medieval churchman and university chancellor.

Between 1256 and 1262, Richard de S. Agatha was Chancellor of Oxford University.

There is some confusion between Richard or Robert de Sancta Agatha being an Archdeacon of Durham.

References

Year of birth unknown
Year of death unknown
13th-century English Roman Catholic priests
Chancellors of the University of Oxford